Congressman Green may refer to:

 Al Green (born 1947)
 Frederick Green (1816–1879)
 Mark Green (born 1964)

Title and name disambiguation pages